Reginald Herbert, 15th Earl of Pembroke and 12th Earl of Montgomery  (8 September 1880 – 13 January 1960) was a British peer. His parents were Sidney Herbert, 14th Earl of Pembroke and Beatrix Louisa Lambton, daughter of George Lambton, 2nd Earl of Durham. He descended from a Russian aristocratic family, the Woronzows, through the marriage of Catherine Woronzow to George Augustus Herbert, 11th Earl of Pembroke. Catherine's father, Count Semyon Vorontsov, the Russian ambassador to Britain, brought the family to London in 1785.

He married Lady Beatrice Eleanor Paget (of the marquesses of Anglesey) on 21 January 1904 and they had four children:
Lady Patricia Herbert (12 November 1904 – 19 March 1994); 
Sidney, Lord Herbert (9 January 1906 – 16 March 1969); 
The Honourable David Herbert (3 October 1908 – 3 April 1995); and
Lt.-Col Hon. Anthony Edward George Herbert (12 September 1911 – 22 August 1971)

Pembroke was succeeded in his titles and estates by his eldest son.

During the Second World War, he worked at the Foreign Office, in which capacity he was the addressee of an often-reproduced humorous note sent by Sir Archibald Clark Kerr, who was British Ambassador to Moscow.

References

1880 births
1960 deaths
Reginald Herbert, 15th Earl of Pembroke
British people of Russian descent
Deputy Lieutenants of Wiltshire
15
Reginald
20th-century English nobility